Töging am Inn is a town of 9,382 inhabitants in the district of Altötting, Upper Bavaria, Germany. It lies on the river Inn.

History

Thanks to an artificial water canal, the town is adjacent to a large water power plant, which used to power e.g. an aluminum furnace. Because of many factories in the area, slave workers from the Dachau concentration camp were located nearby during World War II,.

The town hit the news on 7 February 2006, when the roof of the local Netto supermarket collapsed. Nobody was hurt in the incident.

References

External links
 

Populated places on the Inn (river)